Sophia Abrahão is the debut studio album by Brazilian singer Sophia Abrahão. It was released on 16 October 2015 by FS Music. "Náufrago" was released as the lead single from the album on September 29, 2015. The album contains 11 songs including a re-recording of "Resposta", song authored by rock band Skank. The album was produced by Fernando Zor.

Promotion

Singles 
 "Náufrago": Released on September 29, 2015 was the first song to be single from the album "Sophia Abrahão". In the music video, Sophia made romantic couple with the actor Murilo Armacollo.

Promotional singles
 "Nós Três": Released on November 13, 2015.
 "Bom Dia": Was released on November 17, 2015.

Track listing
Se Vira (Bruno Caliman) – 3:26
Besteira (Lucas Santos, Rafael Torres) – 3:36
Náufrago (Lucas Santos, Rafael Torres, Bruno Villas) – 3:14
Pelúcia (Bruno Caliman, Maloka, Fernando Zor) – 2:31
Bom Dia (Bruno Caliman) – 3:17
Tipo Assim (Bruno Caliman) – 3:18
Resposta (Samuel Rosa, Nando Reis) – 2:55
Valeu Demais (Bruno Caliman) – 3:44
Ligar pra Quê? (Fernando Zor, Maloka) – 3:28
Nós Três (Bruno Caliman) – 3:08
Sinal Vermelho (Theo Fabbri, Fernando Zor) – 2:58

Release history

References

2015 debut albums
Portuguese-language albums
Sophia Abrahão albums